Justice Kirby refers to Michael Kirby (judge), justice of the High Court of Australia. Justice Kirby may also refer to:

Ephraim Kirby, judge of the Superior Court of the Territory of Mississippi
Holly M. Kirby, associate justice of the Tennessee Supreme Court